Peter Boxall is a British academic and writer. He is Professor of English in the Department of English at the University of Sussex. He works on contemporary literature, literary theory and literary modernism. Boxall is notable as the editor of the well-established journal of literary theory, Textual Practice, for his editorship of 1001 Books You Must Read Before You Die and The Oxford History of the Novel, Volume 7: British and Irish Fiction Since 1940, and for his work on contemporary fiction, most notably Twenty-First-Century Fiction (Cambridge University Press, 2013) and The Value of the Novel (Cambridge University Press, 2015).

Published works

Articles 
2015: Science, technology and the posthuman. The Cambridge Companion to British Fiction Since 1945.

2012: Late: Fictional Time in the Twenty-First Century. Contemporary Literature, pp. 681–712.

2011: The threshold of vision: the animal gaze in Becket, Sebald, and Coetzee. Journal of Beckett Studies, 20 (2). pp. 120–148

2008: "There's no lack of void": waste and abundance in Beckett and DeLillo. SubStance, 37(2). pp. 56–70.

2007: Boxall, Peter, Hadfield, Andrew, Smith, Lindsay and Surprenant, Celene. Preface. Year's Work in Critical and Cultural Theory.

Books 
2015: Boxall, Peter  The value of the novel. Cambridge University Press, Cambridge. 

2013: Boxall, Peter  Twenty-first century fiction: a critical introduction. Cambridge University Press, Cambridge. 

2009: Boxall, Peter Since Beckett: contemporary writing in the wake of modernism. Continuum Literary Studies . Continuum.

Editor 
2010: 1001 Books You Must Read Before You Die, Revised and Updated Edition. 

2006: 1001 Books You Must Read Before You Die.

References 

Living people
British literary theorists
British academics of English literature
Year of birth missing (living people)
Academics of the University of Sussex